Hazzour (also known as Hazzur or Khirbat-Hazzour) is a Syrian village located in the Ayn Halaqim Subdistrict in Masyaf District, located southwest of Hama. According to the Syria Central Bureau of Statistics (CBS), Hazzour had a population of 479 in the 2004 census. Its inhabitants are predominantly Christians.

References

Bibliography

Populated places in Masyaf District
Eastern Orthodox Christian communities in Syria
Christian communities in Syria